Narayana Swamy (born 28 December 1944), known by his stage name Srinath, is an Indian actor and film producer who works predominantly in Kannada cinema. He holds the position of vice-president of the Kannada television channel Udaya TV. He is popular for presenting the Game Show, Adarsha Dampatigalu. Srinath has earned the nickname Pranaya Raja meaning 'King of Romance' because of his stupendous success in romantic movies during the 70s. In 2003, he was conferred the 
‛Kalaratna’ Award by the Government of Karnataka.

Early life
Narayana Swamy was born on 28 December 1943 to Ramaswamy Shastri and Lalita in Mysore, in the Kingdom of Mysore of India. Initially, he acted in amateur plays and practiced cinematography in Occupational Institute in Bangalore. He entered films with a small role in the Kannada movie Lagna Pathrike. After that, he got a chance to play the main role in a film called Madhura Milana and his name was changed to Srinath. In 1975 the stupendous success of the cult movie Shubhamangala by Puttanna Kanagal made him a popular hero in Kannada cinema.

Film life

Srinath has acted in over 350 films. Shubhamangala (ಶುಭ ಮಂಗಳ) is his biggest hit. He has won the State award as best actor for Sri Raghavendra Vaibhava and the Filmfare award for Besuge (ಬೆಸುಗೆ). In 1982 he had produced Maanasa Sarovara (ಮಾನಸ ಸರೋವರ) for his mentor Puttanna Kanagal. Srinath was also preparing to direct a Kannada movie. He formed a popular pair with top actress Manjula with whom he acted in a record 35 films during the 1970s and 80s.

Political life
Srinath was nominated by Bharatiya Janata Party as member of legislative council from the artiste fraternity for a period of six years.

Udaya TV
Srinath was the Vice President of the Udaya TV Kannada Channel and hosted the Game Show Adarsha Dampatigalu. He still continues to act in films and TV serials.

Awards and honours
In the year of 1980-81 he was honored by the Karnataka State Film Award for Best Actor for his effective portrayal of the role of Raghavendra in the movie Sri Raghavendra Vaibhava. In year 2003, Srinath was honoured with the Kalaratna (Gem of Art) award by Adarsha Suguma Sangeeta Academy Trust, in Bangalore.
The award was honoured by S.M. Shankar, the brother of S.M. Krishna, the then Chief Minister of Karnataka.
In the same year, Srinath was honoured with the prestigious Karnataka Rajyotsava Award given by the Government of Karnataka. Then in 2013 Karnataka State Film Awards, he's honored by the prestigious Dr. Rajkumar Award for his lifetime achievement to Kannada Cinema.
After completing 100 films he was given the title "Abhinaya Chakravarthy"in 1982.

Personal life
Srinath is the younger brother of renowned Kannada theatre artist as well as film actor and writer C. R. Simha. Srinath is married to Geetha Srinath. The couple have two children, a son and a daughter. His son Rohit has acted in several Kannada movies as a child artist. His daughter Amulya currently lives in the U.S. with her husband and three daughters.

Contribution to society
Srinath has set up a charitable trust called Deeya Art Foundation, to provide a helping-hand to the poor and needy who are affected by diseases like cancer, HIV and heart-related ailments. Among the objectives of the foundation are:
 Organising entertainment programs exclusively for cancer-affected patients
 Free health check-up camps
 Fund-raising camps for the physically handicapped
 Service activities at old-age homes
 Blood donation camps
 Free supply of medicines and nutritional food

Partial filmography

Television

References

External links
 
 Srinath's Profile on Chitraranga.com

Male actors in Kannada cinema
Indian male film actors
Living people
Male actors from Mysore
1944 births
Filmfare Awards South winners
Kannada male actors
20th-century Indian male actors
21st-century Indian male actors
Businesspeople from Mysore
Indian television presenters
Recipients of the Rajyotsava Award 2003